Acrobalance is a floor-based acrobatic art that involves balances, lifts and creating shapes performed in pairs or groups.
A performer on the ground doing the lifting and supporting in an acrobalance formation is often called the base, while a performer being lifted or tossed can be referred to as the flyer (or flier). Formats include male/female duo, trio, female/female, and other variations.

Acrobalance acts require a high degree of care, coordination, proprioceptive awareness, and mutual trust from the performers in order to avoid injury; they are often set to music and performed as part of circuses. Acrobalance performances can now also be seen on a wide variety of shows such as street performances, incorporated into children's theater and as part of modern dance performances.

Technique
Acrobalance is the combination of the two athletic art forms:

 Adagio: consists of partner lifts, usually performed by a man and a woman, where the male lifts his female partner in many different poses and positions. Many forms of adagio also incorporate throws and tosses; the male usually throws the female into somersaults, layouts, and other acrobatic maneuvers. Many styles of dance incorporate some form of adagio (as dance lifts), including ballet (in pas de deux), jazz, and lyrical. Ice skaters also perform lifts that belong to the adagio art. Whenever a person lifts another up in different artistic poses, or performs tosses where the bottom mounter catches the top mounter again, it is considered adagio.

 Hand balancing: performance of acrobatic body shape changing movements, or stationary poses, or both, while balanced on and supported entirely by one's hands or arms. It is performed by acro dancers, circus performers, gymnasts, and sports acrobats. Hand balancing may be performed by partners or individuals. In partner hand balancing, a strong bottom mounter supports the top mounter in handstands, planches and other acrobatic poses.  In solo hand balancing, a single artist performs handstands, one-hand stands, planches and other equilibristic maneuvers, usually on top of pommels, blocks or other apparatuses.

See also
 Acrobatic gymnastics
 Human pyramid
 Castell
 Human tower (gymnastic formation)
 Acroyoga

References

External links
 Circus stunts tutorial - Directions for performing some common acrobalance formations.
 Truuk.nl - A database of 220 acrobalance formations, including transitions between various poses.  In Dutch.
  - is a free resource that brings information and ideas together about the art of acro. This resource has been created to help acrobats develop their practice, and to foster a sense of global community.

Circus skills